KAGL (93.3 FM, "The Eagle") is a radio station broadcasting a classic rock format. Licensed to El Dorado, Arkansas, United States, the station serves the El Dorado area. The station is currently owned by Noalmark Broadcasting Corporation and features local programming.

History
The station was assigned call sign KLTW on April 13, 1989. On April 26, 1993, the station changed its call sign to KISQ, and on April 17, 1997 to the current KAGL.

References

External links

AGL
Classic rock radio stations in the United States
Radio stations established in 1989
Noalmark Broadcasting Corporation radio stations
El Dorado, Arkansas